The 1989 IIHF Asian Oceanic Junior U18 Championship was the sixth edition of the IIHF Asian Oceanic Junior U18 Championship. It took place between 13 and 18 February 1989 in Hachinohe, Japan. The tournament was won by Japan, who claimed their fourth title by finishing first in the standings. South Korea and China finished second and third respectively.

Standings

Fixtures
Reference

References

External links
International Ice Hockey Federation

IIHF Asian Oceanic U18 Championships
Asian
International ice hockey competitions hosted by Japan